is a Japanese boxer. He competed at the 1984 Summer Olympics and the 1988 Summer Olympics.

References

1962 births
Living people
Japanese male boxers
Olympic boxers of Japan
Boxers at the 1984 Summer Olympics
Boxers at the 1988 Summer Olympics
Place of birth missing (living people)
Asian Games medalists in boxing
Boxers at the 1986 Asian Games
Boxers at the 1990 Asian Games
Asian Games silver medalists for Japan
Asian Games bronze medalists for Japan
Medalists at the 1986 Asian Games
Medalists at the 1990 Asian Games
Light-welterweight boxers